Gator's Groove is an album by saxophonist Willis Jackson which was recorded in 1968 and released on the Prestige label. Jackson first recorded the title tune for Atlantic Records in 1952; this is the version that circulates most today.

Reception

Allmusic awarded the album 3 stars.

Track listing 
All compositions by Willis Jackson except where noted.
 "Brother Ray" (Ray Barretto) – 4:10
 "A Day in the Life of a Fool" (Carl Sigman, Luiz Bonfá) – 6:35
 "This is the Way I Feel" – 9:50
 "Blue Jays" (Bill Jennings, Jackie Ivory, Willis Jackson) – 7:13
 "Stolen Sweets" (Wild Bill Davis, Dickie Thompson) – 5:35
 "Long Tall Dexter" (Dexter Gordon) – 7:07

Personnel 
Willis Jackson – tenor saxophone, gator horn
Jackie Ivory – organ
Bill Jennings – guitar
Ben Tucker – bass, electric bass
Jerry Potter – drums
Richard Landrum – congas

References 

Willis Jackson (saxophonist) albums
1969 albums
Prestige Records albums
Albums recorded at Van Gelder Studio
Albums produced by Bob Porter (record producer)